Sara Nordin (born 26 March 1993) is a Swedish football defender who plays in Damallsvenskan for AIK and previously for KIF Örebro DFF, Fiorentina, and Umeå IK.

Honours 
KIF Örebro DFF
Runner-up
 Damallsvenskan: 2014

References

External links 
 KIF Örebro player profile
 
 
 
 

1993 births
Living people
Swedish women's footballers
Sunnanå SK players
KIF Örebro DFF players
Damallsvenskan players
Serie A (women's football) players
Expatriate women's footballers in Italy
Women's association football defenders
Fiorentina Women's F.C. players
Åland United players
Kansallinen Liiga players
Umeå IK players
Expatriate women's footballers in Finland
Elitettan players